Me and Me Moke is a 1916 British silent comedy film directed by Harold M. Shaw and starring Edna Flugrath, Gerald Ames and Hubert Willis. The screenplay concerns a young man from a wealthy background who takes a job working as a porter at the fruit and vegetable market in Covent Garden.

Cast
 Edna Flugrath as Kitty Kingsland
 Gerald Ames as Harry Masterman
 Hubert Willis as Labby
 Sydney Fairbrother as Mammy
 Lewis Gilbert as Flash Hawkins
 Douglas Munro as James Hilliard
 Gwynne Herbert as Mrs. Kingsland

References

External links

1916 films
1916 comedy films
British comedy films
Films set in London
Films directed by Harold M. Shaw
British silent feature films
British black-and-white films
1910s English-language films
1910s British films
Silent comedy films